Disillusion or Disillusioned may refer to:

Film and TV
Disillusion (La gerla di papà Martin), 1940 French film by Mario Bonnard with Ruggero Ruggeri, Germana Paolieri, Luisella Beghi  
Disillusion (Disillusione), 1912 Italian short film by Gustavo Serena

Disillusioned, magic show with Matt Marcy
"Disillusion" (Upstairs, Downstairs), a 1975 episode of Upstairs, Downstairs

Music
Disillusion (band), a German progressive metal band
Disillusion (album), a 1984 album by Japanese heavy metal band Loudness
Disillusioned (Rex Ilusivii album)

Songs
"Disillusion" (ABBA song)
"Disillusion" (Sachi Tainaka song)
"Disillusion", second part of the song "Starship Trooper" by Yes
"Disillusioned", song by A Perfect Circle 2017
"Disillusioned", song by Oliver Nelson from Afro/American Sketches 1961
"Disillusioned", song by New Zealand band Atlas Reasons for Voyaging  2007 
"Disillusioned", song by The Tams 1962